Jiří Krejčí (born 22 March 1986) is a retired footballer from Czech Republic.

Club career

Early career
Krejčí begun his youth career at Sparta Prague. Then he spent the next years playing for Chmel Blšany and Baník Most.

Jablonec 97
Young Krejčí signed Jablonec in 2007. He became regular, finishing as runner-up in 2009–2010 season. Krejčí was the best centre back of Jablonec, but he refused to sign a new contract.

Politehnica Timișoara
Krejčí made the big step of his career signing for Romanian giants FC Politehnica Timișoara on 15 October for five years. He was handed the number 3. At his presentation at press conference, said : "I am very happy to be here, is an important step in my career. Poli Timișoara is a well known name in the Czech Republic, thanks to Dušan Uhrin. I hope to help the team to back European Cups in the summer. Krejčí left the team on 18 June 2011 after he failed to make an impression and played just for reserves team.

References

External links
 
 
 Guardian Football

1986 births
Living people
Sportspeople from Jablonec nad Nisou
Czech footballers
Association football defenders
Czech Republic youth international footballers
FK Chmel Blšany players
FK Baník Most players
FK Jablonec players
1. FK Příbram players
FC Politehnica Timișoara players
Pécsi MFC players
FC Vysočina Jihlava players
1. FC Slovácko players
Czech First League players
Nemzeti Bajnokság I players
Czech expatriate footballers
Expatriate footballers in Romania
Expatriate footballers in Hungary
Czech expatriate sportspeople in Romania
Czech expatriate sportspeople in Hungary